Mauda Super Thermal Power Station or NTPC Mauda is located at Mauda a Tehsil in Ramtek subdivision of Nagpur district in Nagpur revenue Division in the Berar region in the state of Maharashtra, India. The power plant is one of the coal based power plants of National Thermal Power Corporation. 1000 MW Stage 1 was dedicated to nation by Prime Minister Narendra Modi on 21 August 2014.

Bharat Heavy Electricals Limited (BHEL) is the EPC contractor (EPCC) for the power project.

Capacity

Gallery

References

Coal-fired power stations in Maharashtra
Nagpur district
2009 establishments in Maharashtra
Energy infrastructure completed in 2009